Ingus or Inguss is a Latvian masculine given name. It is a variant of Indriķis, the Latvian form of Henry and may refer to:
Ingus Bankevics (born 1985), Latvian professional basketball player
Ingus Baušķenieks (born 1956), Latvian musician (Dzeltenie Pastnieki) 
Ingus Jakovičs (born 1993), Latvian basketball player
Ingus Janevics (born 1986), Latvian race walker and Olympic competitor
Ingus Pētersons (born 1959), Latvian opera singer
Ingus Veips (born 1969), Latvian cyclist

Latvian masculine given names